Srinivasan Venkatakrishnan is an Indian Born UK Mining and Restructuring executive. He is the current Chairman of Endeavour Mining PLC.
He joined Weir Group in January 2021, and BlackRock World Mining Trust in August 2021 both as a Non-Executive Director.

He previously served as CEO of Vedanta Resources plc
 between 2018-2020 and was CEO of AngloGold Ashanti Limited between 2013-2018, having previously been Chief Financial Officer of the business from 2005, and of Ashanti Goldfields Limited from 2000.

He is a Chartered Accountant and commerce graduate from the University of Madras, India.

References

Businesspeople of Indian descent
Living people
University of Madras alumni
1966 births